Dommedagsnatt is the only album released by Thorr's Hammer. It was originally released on Moribund Records on cassette in 1996, but it was not until it was re-released on CD in 1998 on Southern Lord Records (the first release for the label) that it began to gain more popularity. The CD release contained a track that was not on the original cassette version (Mellom Galgene). Since then it has been reissued in 2004 on CD again, this time with a bonus live video, and on picture disc (limited to 1000 copies).  In 2009, Southern Lord reissued the album on vinyl (in both clear and black vinyl versions) with new cover art.

Track listing
 "Norge" – 7:37
 "Troll" – 4:25
 "Dommedagsnatt" – 8:07
 "Mellom Galgene" (Live) – 12:12

Credits
Runhild Gammelsæter (aka Ozma) - vocals and lyrics
Greg Anderson - electric guitar
Stephen O'Malley - electric guitar
James Hale - bass guitar
Jamie Sykes - drums

References 

1996 albums
Thorr's Hammer albums
Southern Lord Records albums